The Perryville American Legion Building is a historic fraternal meeting hall at Plum and Main Streets in Perryville, Arkansas.  It is a single story masonry building with Rustic and Tudor styling.  It has a steeply pitched gable roof, with a projecting gabled entry vestibule facing the street.  The gable ends are decorated with half-timbering, and the roof eaves show exposed rafter ends in the Craftsman style.  The hall was built in 1935 by the Civilian Conservation Corps, and is the community's best example of the Rustic style.

The building was listed on the U.S. National Register of Historic Places in 1990.

See also
National Register of Historic Places listings in Perry County, Arkansas

References

American Legion buildings
Cultural infrastructure completed in 1935
Clubhouses on the National Register of Historic Places in Arkansas
National Register of Historic Places in Perry County, Arkansas
Individually listed contributing properties to historic districts on the National Register in Arkansas
1935 establishments in Arkansas
Rustic architecture in Arkansas
Tudor Revival architecture in Arkansas
Civilian Conservation Corps in Arkansas